Ayoun al Atrous (also known as Aioun el Atrouss) is a town in southern Mauritania. It is the capital of Hodh El Gharbi region. The town is located in the southern area of the Aoukar, a former lake basin.

Ayoun al Atrous was one of the stops in the 2007 Dakar Rally.

References

Hodh El Gharbi Region
Regional capitals in Mauritania
Populated places in Mauritania